M. Krishnappa may refer to:

M. Krishnappa (politician, born 1918), Indian politician
M. Krishnappa (politician, born 1953), Indian politician
M. Krishnappa (politician, born 1962), Indian politician